Melinda Leanna Shankar (born February 18, 1992) is a Canadian actress. She is best known for starring as Alli Bhandari in the television series Degrassi: The Next Generation (2008-2015) and as Indira "Indie" Mehta in the YTV series How To Be Indie (2009-2011), for which she won several awards, including a Canadian Screen Award in 2013.

Early life
Melinda Shankar was born on February 18, 1992, in Ottawa, Ontario, Canada to Canadian parents of Hindu Indo-Guyanese descent who immigrated to Canada. She has two older sisters and a brother, who is also an actor. She was raised in Orleans, Ontario, a suburban section of Ottawa.

She began studying ballet and karate at the age of three. Shankar currently has a black belt in karate. She attended Sir Wilfrid Laurier Secondary School in Ottawa until grade 11 before moving to Toronto when she was sixteen, following her casting in Degrassi: The Next Generation in 2008.

Career

Acting
Shankar began her career as a child model and appeared in numerous print advertisements, including a Procter & Gamble billboard in Los Angeles. Shankar's mother was an actress and her paternal grandfather was a director in Guyana. Shankar's father would often drive up to five hours from Ottawa to Toronto for her auditions.

In 2008, she debuted as an actress in the popular CTV television series Degrassi, joining the cast as an incoming 9th grade student. Shankar left the show in 2015, after seven seasons.In 2009, she starred in a television series on YTV called How To Be Indie. She played the lead role of Indira "Indie" Metha for two seasons. The series aired its final episode in October 24, 2011. For her role, Shankar won a Gemini Award in 2011 and a Canadian Screen Award in 2013.

Shankar was cast in her first feature film, Festival of Lights in 2010. The movie was filmed on location in New York City and Georgetown, Guyana. Her father served as production manager for the film due to his familiarity with the locations in Guyana.

Other work
In 2013, Shankar and a longtime childhood friend began working on an image consulting business.

On February 22, 2014, Shankar launched Miss Conception, a professional styling and image agency based in Toronto.

Personal life
In 2008, Shankar and her family moved to Toronto when she was cast in Degrassi. She currently resides in North York, a district in Toronto.

Filmography

References

External links 

 Miss Conception Image Agency

1992 births
Living people
Actresses from Ottawa
Canadian film actresses
Canadian television actresses
Canadian child actresses
Canadian actresses of Indian descent
Canadian people of Indo-Guyanese descent
Canadian people of Guyanese descent
21st-century Canadian actresses